The Boston Courier was an American newspaper based in Boston, Massachusetts. It was founded on March 2, 1824, by Joseph T. Buckingham as a daily newspaper which supported protectionism. Buckingham served as editor until he sold out completely in 1848, after suffering a severe financial crisis in 1837 and losing much of his editorial authority. The Boston Courier supported the National Republicans, and later the Whig Party. In the period before the American Civil War, its editors, including George S. Hillard and George Lunt, supported the states' right position on the abolition of slavery. From 1867 to 1915 the Boston Courier (New Series) was a weekly newspaper published by Libbey & Dennison.

References

See also

 The Boston Daily Advertiser
 The Boston Herald
 The Boston Globe
 The Boston Journal
 The Boston News-Letter
 The Boston Post
''The Boston Evening Transcript

Newspapers published in Boston
Defunct newspapers published in Massachusetts
Defunct companies based in Massachusetts
1824 establishments in Massachusetts
1915 disestablishments in Massachusetts
Publications established in 1824
Publications disestablished in 1915